is a 2010 Japanese anime science fiction film part of the Gundam metaseries and directed by Seiji Mizushima. The film is set two years after the second season of Mobile Suit Gundam 00, as the film sees Celestial Being against a group of hostile aliens known as ELS.  The film is notable for being the first entry in Gundam to feature aliens as its antagonists.  The film premiered on September 18, 2010, and was released on Blu-ray & DVD in Japan on December 25, 2010.

Plot

Two years after the defeat of the "Innovators" and A-Laws, an unknown alien fragment lands on a research station and reactivates it, causing it to head towards Earth. In Celestial Being's Asteroid Base, Ian Vashti greets his wife, Linda, after her 2-year assignment and unloads two new GN Drives and a new incomplete Gundam, the GNT-0000 00 Qan[T]. Saji Crossroad is taking care of Louise Halevy, who is still under medical care in a hospital due to physical changes by the Innovators. Marina Ismail and Shirin Bakhtiar inspect a colony construction facility but their shuttle is attacked by assassins. However Setsuna F. Seiei arrives and destroys them, with Lockon in the cockpit stopping another assassin from killing Marina, afterwards he leaves with Setsuna.

Meanwhile, the Earth Sphere Federation has found the research station heading towards earth and sends out GN-XIV's, led by Andrei Smirnov, to destroy it. Kati Mannequin arrived on board the Celestial Being station with Patrick Colasour and encounter Veda along with its surviving Innovades, now serving the Federation to maintain the mothership. They later meet the newest emerging Innovator, Captain Descartes Shaman. When the probe ship is still heading towards Earth despite being hit by GN missiles, Descartes heads out and pilots the GNMA-Y0002V Gadelaza, successfully destroying the ship, with debris falling to Earth. Soon after, Earth experiences strange events, with electronic vehicles and devices operating on their own. A young girl Amia Lee arrives at her home, only to be attacked by a man (Sky Eclipse) in a space suit.

Billy Katagiri meets with Mehna Carmine to analyze Amia whose body has been partially assimilated with a new metal. They hypothesize that the events occurring are related to the alien metal lifeform, now dubbed the Extraterrestrial Living-metal Shape-shifters (ELS). During this time, Setsuna and Louise's quantum brainwaves give them ominous feelings about upcoming events. Setsuna's concern magnifies when the Ptolemaios crew is unable to contact Allelujah and Marie.

Saji witnesses a blackout in the hospital with Louise. They scream as a man in a spacesuit appears before them. He is about to touch Louise when Setsuna appears and shoots the man's visor, revealing him to be the same type of Innovade as Ribbons Almark. The attacker is only stopped with a plastic explosive. In Mongolia, a traveling Allelujah Haptism and Marie Parfacy are attacked and chased by living technology infected by the ELS. Lockon Stratos arrives in the GN-002RE Gundam Dynames Repair and helps destroy them and brings them back to their mothership, the Ptolemaios.

The same Jupiter research station that had been destroyed reappears and the Celestial Being forces moves to intercept it. Setsuna heads out in the 00 Raiser Condenser Type, along with Lockon in his new Gundam, the Zabanya, and Allelujah, paired with Marie in the Gundam Harute, confront the ELS. Problems began to arise when Setsuna is unable to fight the ELS due to quantum brainwave interference. The 00 Raiser begins to undergo assimilation, however Tieria Erde arrives in the Raphael Gundam and rips out 00 Raiser's infected left arm, allowing Setsuna and the team to escape. Unknown to both the Federation and Ptolemaios crew, the ELS had begun launching its forces from Jupiter's Big Red Spot, sucking in Io and Ganymede.

The Federation forces later travel to Mars in order to discover the ELS's intentions, with Descartes heading out first in the Gadelaza. However most of its ships and Mobile suits were assimilated, and Descartes ends up being assimilated as well, killing him in the process. Celestial Being arrives too late to save the Federation soldiers and engages in battle against the ELS. Setsuna executes Trans-Am Burst in an attempt to communicate with the ELS, theorizing that this is the "dialogues to come" that Aeolia Schenberg was conditioning humanity for. Unfortunately, Setsuna falls victim to a mental attack from the ELS and is rendered comatose in the middle of battle. Tieria reveals Raphael Gundam's backpack, GN-008RE Seravee Gundam II, and rips 00 Raiser's cockpit from the frame, handing it to Lockon as Tieria tries to hold off the ELS with his quantum brainwaves. With the ELS surrounding him, Tieria self-destructs his Gundam to take out ELS with him. The Sol Brave Squadron, led by Graham Aker, arrive and help Celestial Being escape. Tieria's conscious mind returns to Veda and Feldt Grace desperately awaits at Setsuna's side to awaken. After the battle, the Ptolemaios crew and the Earth Sphere Federation witness the appearance of a large moon-size ELS, determining that it will arrive at Earth in 92 days.

With most of the civilians being informed of the situation and heading towards shelters, Saji tells Louise that he's going to the Orbital Elevator to help fight the ELS as the last line of defense. On the day of the ELS's arrival, the Federation Fleet gathered alongside Forces from the Federation Members and launch a counterattack against the ELS with a missile barrage, which is rendered futile by the ELS' adapting. Kati, in charge of the operation, orders to fire the ship's main cannon, which damages the ELS superstructure. During this time, Tieria requests that Ian Vashti install a miniature Veda terminal in the cockpit of 00 Qan[T] to handle the massive amounts of information that would result from linking with the ELS again.

The battle begins, many of the Federation's Baikal-class ships are assimilated by the ELS, who subsequently created their own copies of the technology. Zabanya and Harute arrive to assist the ESF and member forces in battle. Despite the much needed backup, the ELS still overwhelms the allied forces and assimilates many ships and Mobile Suits. Andrei Smirnov notices one of the ELS ships heading straight for Earth and self-destructs his GNX to destroy the ELS ship at the cost of his life. Meanwhile, on board the Ptolemaios 2, a still-comatose Setsuna lies in a dream-like state. There, he has visions of the first Lockon, Christina Sierra, and Lichtendahl Tsery. Setsuna then sees the flower that Feldt gave him and finally wakes up with Feldt at his side. He sorties in the GNT-0000 00 Qan[T] for battle, while Feldt returns to the bridge.

In battle, Patrick's GN-XIV is hit by an ELS and is slowly assimilated. He prepares to self-destruct before saying goodbyes to Kati, when Setsuna blasts Patrick's GNX, saving him from assimilation. With a large number of ELS appearing, the Harute is eventually assimilated and Allelujah and Marie are forced to eject. Setsuna attempts to communicate with the ELS via the Twin Drive’s quantum effect, but it is to no avail as the ELS constantly thwart Setsuna's attempts. Tieria, now a small hologram inside of the 00 Qan[T], tells Setsuna that Trans-Am is necessary for the dialogues. Graham Aker, now partially assimilated, decides to believe in a better future for humanity and sacrifices himself to create a large hole using Trans-Am, allowing Setsuna to enter the core of the ELS ship. The Battle begins to transform into a massacre with swarms of ELS even attacking the orbital elevator where Saji is working at. After Setsuna establishes contact, he realizes the attack was a misunderstanding as assimilation was their only means to understand humanity. It also revealed that the ELS's original homeworld had been consumed by a red giant star and they began searching the universe for a new home. Along the way they reformed various planets and eventually found a new home, eventually setting out into the vast reaches of space to explore the universe. Through Setsuna's quantum brainwaves, the true intention of the ELS's arrival to Earth was understood, and the battle was halted. Setsuna becomes humanity's liaison and uses the 00 Qan[T] to quantize to the ELS homeworld. The ELS then uses Setsuna's vision of a flower to alter the superstructure of their mother ship, ending the battle.

In a flashback, a much younger Aeolia Schenberg is shown speaking with E. A. Ray (the human base for Ribbons Almark) of his plan, and comments that humanity must unite if they hope to have any chance of reaching the future. Fifty years later, the flower in space is now a deep space station for intergalactic travel, with the ELS now co-existing with humanity. A ship named after Sumeragi is being prepared for travel, being crewed by Innovators. As a news correspondent is talking on camera, a Tieria type Innovade can be seen floating by. In an undisclosed countryside, a blind and older Marina is playing the piano and senses someone entering. He reveals himself as Setsuna, now an ELS/Innovator hybrid, fulfilling his promise to see her again. Setsuna tells a crying Marina that he finally understands her message of peace, and they share an emotional embrace. Outside, an ELS winged 00 Qan[T] covered in flowers emits GN Particles in an angelic fashion.

Box office
The film was released in Japan on September 18, and was ranked at #3 in its first weekend with US$2,260,690 on just 88 screens.

Critical reception

The film has received mixed reviews, with Michael Toole from Anime News Network ranking the film an Overall C grade, stating that it had "mouth-watering mecha battles, and a few really nicely tender moments for fans of the show's characters" but that it was "a confused mess of a film with too little plot and too many characters; only made watchable by its numerous action scenes and famous namesake." Marcello from JapanCinema also gave the film an Overall C, stating that "the hype and everything else that comes with it, is a failure." Chris Guanche, editor-in-chief of Mecha & Anime HQ, gave the film a positive review with 4.5 stars, concluding "This movie is definitely not intended for newcomers, and at times it can be a little unsubtle and preachy about its theme of understanding, but it serves as the perfect conclusion to the story of the 00 universe.",also has an aesthetic mood and ending to the audience.

References

External links
 
00 Gundam Official Site

2010 anime films
Alien invasions in films
Alien visitations in films
Bandai Entertainment anime titles
Films about extraterrestrial life
Films directed by Seiji Mizushima
Japanese animated science fiction films
Mobile Suit Gundam 00
Films with screenplays by Yōsuke Kuroda
Shochiku films
Yun Kōga
Films scored by Kenji Kawai